These are the results for the women’s doubles badminton tournament of 2000 Summer Olympics. The tournament was single-elimination. Matches consisted of three sets, with sets being to 15 for women's doubles. The tournament was held at Pavilion 3, Sydney Olympic Park.

Seeds 
  (gold medalist)
  (silver medalist)
  (fourth place)
  (quarterfinals)
  (quarterfinals)
  (bronze medalist)
  (quarterfinals)
  (quarterfinals)

Results

Draw

Final

Top half

Bottom half

References

External links 
 2000 Sydney Olympic Games – Women’s doubles

Badminton at the 2000 Summer Olympics
Women's events at the 2000 Summer Olympics
Olymp